The Ankara St. Térèse Church  is a Catholic Church in Ankara the capital of Turkey.

History
After the 1917 Great Ankara Fire, it was used as the French Embassy until the move to the new service building from 1928 until 1980. Turks and Armenians lived around the church during the Ottoman Empire. Ankara St. Clement's University is north of the church. The church building was registered as a first degree urban site on April 12, 1980.

See also
 Christianity in Turkey
 List of Armenian churches in Turkey

References

Religious buildings and structures in Ankara
Roman Catholic churches in Ankara
Landmarks in Turkey